An iki doll (生人形 iki-ningyō) was a type of Japanese traditional doll. They are life-sized lifelike dolls that were popular in misemono during the Edo period of Japan. The name is now used mainly to denote shop store mannequins.

Artists famous during the Edo period for making iki-ningyō include Akiyama Heijūrō, Takedoa Nuinosuke, Matsumoto Kisaburō (松本喜三郎), and Yasumoto Kamehachi (安本亀八). The dolls that they made were novel not just for their subjects that shocked viewers — figures lying in pools of their own blood, for example, or Akiyama Heijuro's "Development of a Fetus", a life-sized model of a pregnant woman whose abdomen opens up to reveal twelve supposed stages of development of a human fetus in the womb — but for their influence upon the genre of ningyō. The works of Kamehachi and Kisaburō, in particular, contributed to the form an extreme sense of realism.

The earliest exhibition of iki-ningyō, as recorded in Tommori Seiichi's biography of Kamehachi, was on February 2, 1852, by Ōe Chūbei entitled Representations of Modern Dolls in this Year of Abundance in the Naniwashinchi brothel district of Osaka. Chūbei's name imayō-ningyō ("modern dolls") indicated that he considered this form of doll to be modern and new.

References

Further reading 
 
 
 
 
 

Cultural history of Japan
Edo period
Japanese dolls